Núria Prims (born 29 September 1972) is a Spanish theatre, television and film actress from Catalonia.

Biography 
Núria Prims was born in Barcelona on 29 September 1972. She was raised in Sant Andreu. She made her feature film debut by landing a role in the 1995 drama Stories from the Kronen.

She became popular to a television audience in Catalonia owing to her performance as Mariona Montsolís in soap opera Nissaga de poder, whereas she earned a wider visibility in Spain in the wake of her performance playing Dr. Leyre Durán in Hospital Central. She retired from cinema towards 2009, and moved to Menorca, returning to cinema 8 years later upon a personal request from Agustí Villaronga to star as Carlana (the widow of a local cacique) in Uncertain Glory. Her performance earned her several accolades. Among other credits, she has since featured in the period thriller The Barcelona Vampiress and the crime television series Hache.

Accolades

References

External links 
 

1972 births
Living people
Actresses from Barcelona
Spanish film actresses
Spanish television actresses
20th-century Spanish actresses
21st-century Spanish actresses